Flying Scotsman can refer to:
 LNER Class A3 4472 Flying Scotsman, steam locomotive built in 1923
 Flying Scotsman (train), London to Edinburgh service since 1862
 The Flying Scotsman (1929 film), featuring the 1862 train and the 1923 locomotive
 Flying Scotsman, nickname of Scottish athlete and rugby player Eric Liddell (1902–1945)
 "Flying Scotsman", a song by Spear of Destiny from the 1983 album Grapes of Wrath
 The Flying Scotsman, nickname of Scottish darts player Gary Anderson
 The Flying Scotsman, nickname of Scottish cyclist Graeme Obree
 The Flying Scotsman (2006 film), about Graeme Obree
 Flying Scotsman Stakes, a horse race run at Doncaster Racecourse

See also 
 Flying Scot (disambiguation)